The 1967 French Grand Prix was a Formula One motor race held at the Bugatti Circuit, Le Mans on 2 July 1967. It was race 5 of 11 in both the 1967 World Championship of Drivers and the 1967 International Cup for Formula One Manufacturers.

The new Bugatti circuit used the main pit straight at Le Mans, which back in 1967 did not have the Dunlop Chicane, but then turned right at "La Chapelle" into an infield section comprising the third gear "Le Musée" left hander and the second gear "Garage Vert" corner which led onto the back straight, whose only distinctive feature was the "Chemin Aux Boeups" left hand kink (now a left-right chicane) some two-thirds along, before heading back to the pit straight via the "S Bleu" and "Raccordement" corners near the entrance to the pits.

The Bugatti circuit was seen as somewhat boring and was universally unpopular with both drivers and crowds, with only a reported 20,000 attending the race.

Race report 
Graham Hill was on pole and led away for the first lap until Jack Brabham took over. On lap 7 Jim Clark took the lead and Hill passed Brabham to make it a Lotus 1–2. Hill then retook the lead until his crown-wheel and pinion failed on lap 14. The same problem caused Clark's retirement from the lead on lap 23, leaving Brabham ahead of Dan Gurney, Chris Amon and Denny Hulme. On lap 41 a fuel line broke on Gurney's car, making it a Brabham 1-2 and Amon's throttle cable broke several laps later. Brabham drove home serenely to win his first race in eight Grands Prix by 49.5 seconds from teammate Hulme, and over a lap in front of the BRM of Jackie Stewart.

Classification

Qualifying

Race

Championship standings after the race

Drivers' Championship standings

Constructors' Championship standings

References

French Grand Prix
French Grand Prix
1967 in French motorsport